Who Is Jill Scott?: Words and Sounds Vol. 1 is the debut studio album by American singer Jill Scott, released on July 18, 2000, by Hidden Beach Recordings. The album was nominated for Best R&B Album at the 2001 Grammy Awards, whereas "Gettin' in the Way", "A Long Walk", and "He Loves Me (Lyzel in E Flat)" were nominated for Best Female R&B Vocal Performance in 2001, 2002, and 2003, respectively. In 2010, the album was ranked number 70 on Slant Magazines list of "The 100 Best Albums of the 2000s".

The track "He Loves Me (Lyzel in E Flat)", dedicated to Scott's then-husband Lyzel Williams, became particularly popular at Scott's live and televised performances. It also received a club makeover as dance remixes of the song gained popularity and were later included on her 2001 live album Experience: Jill Scott 826+. Gospel singers Karen Clark Sheard and her daughter Kierra also covered the song with new gospel lyrics and ad-libs on the former's 2003 album The Heavens Are Telling. Beyoncé included the song as part of a medley with "Dangerously in Love 2" during her Beyoncé Experience world tour in 2007. The song was also covered by the German pop trio Monrose on their 2006 video release Popstars: The Making of Monrose.

The twelfth track, "The Roots (Interlude)", is an excerpt of the live version of the Roots' 1999 song "You Got Me" (originally featuring Erykah Badu), which Scott co-wrote.

Track listing

Notes
  signifies a co-producer
 Tracks 18–43 (and track 45 on the Japanese edition) consist of silence and last five seconds each; they are not listed on the album sleeve.
 Track 44 includes the remix of "Love Rain" featuring Mos Def as a hidden track, starting at 5:02.

Sample credits
 "Slowly Surely" contains a sample of "Days Gone By (Egyptology)" by Moe Koffman.
 "Watching Me" contains a sample of "No Stranger to Love" by Roy Ayers.
 "Brotha" contains a sample of "Get Out of My Life" by Joe Williams with Thad Jones and Mel Lewis.

Charts

Weekly charts

Year-end charts

Certifications

Notes

References

2000 debut albums
Albums produced by Dre & Vidal
Hidden Beach Recordings albums
Jill Scott (singer) albums